Fiacha (earlier Fíachu) is a name borne by numerous figures from Irish history and mythology, including:

 Fiacha Cennfinnán, High King of Ireland in the 16th or 20th century BC
 Fiacha mac Delbaíth, High King in the 14th or 18th century BC
 Fiacha Labhrainne, High King in the 11th or 15th century BC
 Fiacha Finscothach, High King in the 10th or 14th century BC
 Fiacha Finnailches, High King in the 9th or 13th century BC
 Fiacha Tolgrach, High King in the 6th or 9th century BC
 Fiacha Sraibhtine, High King in the 3rd century BC
 Fiacha Finnfolaidh, High King in the 1st century AD
 Fiacha Muilleathan, a king of Munster in the 3rd century AD
 Fiachu mac Néill, son of Niall of the Nine Hostages

Similar names
 Fiach
 Fiachra
 Fiachna

Irish-language masculine given names